This is a list of media releases of the television series Heartbeat, which includes DVD and VHS.

DVD release 
DVDs of the series in the UK are listed below, released by Network DVD. Only series 1–5 have been released so far in Finland. In Australia (Region 4) Series 1–5 have been released both individually and as a box set. Series 6–10 have also been released. Series 11 and 12 were released on 6 November 2013. Some music has been partly changed or removed due to copyright grounds/licensing costs.

All region releases

References

Heartbeat (British TV series)
Heartbeat (Tv Series)